The women's 5000 m speed skating competition at the 2006 Winter Olympics in Turin, Italy, was held on 25 February.

Records
Prior to this competition, the existing world and Olympic records were as follows.

No new world or Olympic records were set during the competition.

Results

References

Women's speed skating at the 2006 Winter Olympics